Dodds is an unincorporated community in    eastern Clearcreek Township, Warren County, Ohio, United States, formerly on the Cincinnati, Lebanon and Northern Railway.

History
A post office called Dodds was established in 1881, and remained in operation until 1901. The Dodds family had settled the area in the early 19th century.

References

Unincorporated communities in Warren County, Ohio
Unincorporated communities in Ohio